Francis Seiberling (September 20, 1870 – February 1, 1945) was an American lawyer and politician who served two terms as a U.S. Representative from Ohio from 1929 to 1933. He was a cousin of John F. Seiberling.

Biography 
Born in Des Moines, Iowa, Seiberling moved with his parents to Wadsworth, Ohio, in 1873.
He attended the public schools and Wittenberg College, Springfield, Ohio, and was graduated from the College of Wooster, (Ohio) in 1892.
He studied law.
He was admitted to the bar in 1894 and commenced practice in Akron, Ohio.
He was also interested in the manufacture of rubber and tires and served as a director in various manufacturing companies.
He served as a trustee of Wittenberg College.

Congress 
Seiberling was elected as a Republican to the Seventy-first and Seventy-second Congresses (March 4, 1929 – March 3, 1933).
He was an unsuccessful candidate for reelection in 1932 to the Seventy-third Congress.

Later career and death 
He resumed the practice of law.

He died in Akron, Ohio, February 1, 1945.
He was interred in Rose Hill Cemetery.

Sources

External links

 

1870 births
1945 deaths
Politicians from Des Moines, Iowa
Politicians from Akron, Ohio
Wittenberg University alumni
Ohio lawyers
College of Wooster alumni
Seiberling family
Republican Party members of the United States House of Representatives from Ohio